Rimmen may refer to:

Anne Rimmen (born 1981), Norwegian television presenter
Rimmen railway halt, railway station in Denmark